Ashqal (also known as Askal) is a village in Farmahin Rural District, in the Central District of Farahan County, Markazi Province, Iran. At the 2006 census, its population was 125, in 40 families.

References 

Populated places in Farahan County